Kirkandrews (also known as Kirkandrews-on-Esk distinguishing it from Kirkandrews-on-Eden), is a civil parish in City of Carlisle district, Cumbria, England. The parish includes the hamlet of Moat. At the 2011 census it had a population of 493.

There is a parish council, the lowest tier of local government.

Listed buildings

 there are 13 listed buildings in the parish, of which three are at grade II* and the others at grade II.

History 
The parish was formed on 1 April 1934 from Kirkandrews Middle, Kirkandrews Moat and Kirkandrews Nether.

References

External links
 Cumbria County History Trust: Kirkandrews Middle Quarter (nb: provisional research only – see Talk page)
 Cumbria County History Trust: Kirkandrews Nether Quarter (nb: provisional research only – see Talk page)
 Cumbria County History Trust: Kirkandrews Moat Quarter (nb: provisional research only – see Talk page)
 

Civil parishes in Cumbria
City of Carlisle